Heteromicta is a genus of snout moths. It was described by Edward Meyrick in 1886.

Species
 Heteromicta aegidia (Meyrick, 1887)
 Heteromicta alypeta Turner, 1911
 Heteromicta leucospila (Lower, 1907)
 Heteromicta melanomochla (Hampson, 1917)
 Heteromicta myrmecophila (Turner, 1905)
 Heteromicta nigricostella Ragonot, 1901
 Heteromicta ochraceella Ragonot, 1901
 Heteromicta pachytera (Meyrick, 1879)
 Heteromicta phloeomima (Turner, 1911)
 Heteromicta poeodes Turner, 1905
 Heteromicta poliostola Turner, 1904
 Heteromicta sordidella (Walker, 1866)
 Heteromicta tripartitella (Meyrick, 1879

References

Tirathabini
Pyralidae genera